The A76 motorway is a motorway in the Netherlands. It is located entirely in the Dutch province of Limburg.

Overview
The motorway, 27 km long, connects the Belgian border (A2/E314 road) near Stein with Geleen, Heerlen and the German border (A4 road) near Simpelveld. Along the entire stretch of the motorway, the European route E314 travels along the A76.

The A76 features a number of incomplete connections and interchanges. At interchange Ten Esschen, only traffic to and from the western part of the A76 can reach the connecting N281 road. Exit 6, located approximately 1 km to the east, covers traffic from the eastern part of the A76 towards the N281 but not the other way around.

It is mostly two lanes each way. Between Kunderberg and Simpelveld eastbound there is a climbing lane.

Exit list

External links

Motorways in the Netherlands
Motorways in Limburg (Netherlands)
South Limburg (Netherlands)
Transport in Heerlen
Transport in Sittard-Geleen